Avoca is an unincorporated community in Clay County, in the U.S. state of West Virginia.

History
A post office called Avoca was in operation from 1906 until 1909. Avoca was named after a place mentioned in Irish Melodies by Thomas Moore.

References

Unincorporated communities in Clay County, West Virginia
Unincorporated communities in West Virginia